Jane Martin (born 1972) is a female retired professional squash player who represented England.

Squash career
Martin reached a career-high world ranking of World No. 11 in January 1998. Martin won a silver medal at the 1998 Women's World Team Squash Championships and is an eleven times winner of the Northumbria SRA County Championship.

Martin represented England in the women's doubles event, at the 1998 Commonwealth Games in Kuala Lumpur, Malaysia.

She was appointed as Central Regional Coach by Scottish Squash in 2018  and has been the resident coach at the Bridge of Allan Sports Club since 2006.

References 

English female squash players
Living people
1972 births
Squash players at the 1998 Commonwealth Games
Commonwealth Games competitors for England